Wilson Pass may refer to:

 Wilson Pass (Antarctica)
 Wilson Pass (Clark County, Nevada)